Fairplain Township is a civil township of Montcalm County in the U.S. state of Michigan. The population was 1,826 at the 2000 census.

Communities
The Fenwick post office, with ZIP code 48834, serves the southeastern portion of Fairplain Township as well as portions of Bushnell Township to the east, Bloomer Township to the east of Bushnell, and in Ionia County, North Plains Township to the south of Bloomer, Ronald Township to the south of Bushnell, and Orleans Township to the south of Fair Plain. Fenwick was founded in 1872 by B. C. Loree, who named it after his home town, Fenwick, Ontario. A post office opened on April 28, 1873, with James R. Hall as its first postmaster. It was platted and recorded on May 22, 1874, by S. C. Alderman for the proprietors Simon M., Sarah, and David Griswold.
 The city of Belding is to the southwest in Ionia County, and the Belding post office, with ZIP code 48809, also serves an area in southwest Fairplain Township.
 The city of Greenville is to the west, and the Greenville post office, with ZIP code 48838, also serves the western portion of Fairplain Township.
 The village of Sheridan is to the northeast and incorporates as small area of section 1 in the northeast corner of the township. The Sheridan post office, with ZIP code 48884, also serves a larger area in the northeast part of the township.

Geography

Demographics
As of the census of 2000, there were 1,826 people, 615 households, and 492 families residing in the township. There were 664 housing units at an average density of 18.7 per square mile (7.2/km2). The racial makeup of the township was 95.78% White, 1.26% African American, 0.33% Native American, 0.33% Asian, 0.55% from other races, and 1.75% from two or more races. Hispanic or Latino of any race were 2.52% of the population.

There were 615 households, out of which 41.6% had children under the age of 18 living with them, 66.3% were married couples living together, 8.5% had a female householder with no husband present, and 20.0% were non-families. 15.3% of all households were made up of individuals, and 5.2% had someone living alone who was 65 years of age or older.  The average household size was 2.90 and the average family size was 3.17.

In the township the population was spread out, with 29.2% under the age of 18, 7.4% from 18 to 24, 30.4% from 25 to 44, 23.7% from 45 to 64, and 9.2% who were 65 years of age or older.  The median age was 35 years. For every 100 females, there were 106.3 males.  For every 100 females age 18 and over, there were 105.7 males.

The median income for a household in the township was $42,955, and the median income for a family was $46,830. Males had a median income of $32,632 versus $21,442 for females. The per capita income for the township was $15,833.  About 3.8% of families and 8.3% of the population were below the poverty line, including 4.4% of those under age 18 and 8.6% of those age 65 or over.

References

Townships in Montcalm County, Michigan
Townships in Michigan